In mathematics, in the theory of ordinary differential equations in the complex plane , the points of  are classified into ordinary points, at which the equation's coefficients are analytic functions, and singular points, at which some coefficient has a singularity. Then amongst singular points, an important distinction is made between a regular singular point, where the growth of solutions is bounded (in any small sector) by an algebraic function, and an irregular singular point, where the full solution set requires functions with higher growth rates. This distinction occurs, for example, between the hypergeometric equation, with three regular singular points, and the Bessel equation which is in a sense a limiting case, but where the analytic properties are substantially different.

Formal definitions
More precisely, consider an ordinary linear differential equation of -th order

with  meromorphic functions. One can assume that

This may introduce singular points to consider.

The equation should be studied on the Riemann sphere to include the point at infinity as a possible singular point. A Möbius transformation may be applied to move ∞ into the finite part of the complex plane if required, see example on Bessel differential equation below.

This presents no difficulty for  an ordinary point (Lazarus Fuchs 1866). When  is a regular singular point, which by definition means that

Otherwise the point  is an irregular singularity. In that case the monodromy group relating solutions by analytic continuation has less to say in general, and the solutions are harder to study, except in terms of their asymptotic expansions. The irregularity of an irregular singularity is measured by the Poincaré rank.

The regularity condition is a kind of Newton polygon condition, in the sense that the allowed poles are in a region, when plotted against , bounded by a line at 45° to the axes.

An ordinary differential equation whose only singular points, including the point at infinity, are regular singular points is called a Fuchsian ordinary differential equation.

Examples for second order differential equations
In this case the equation above is reduced to:

One distinguishes the following cases:
Otherwise point  is an irregular singular point.

We can check whether there is an irregular singular point at infinity by using the substitution  and the relations:

Listed below are several examples from ordinary differential equations from mathematical physics that have singular points and known solutions.

Bessel differential equation
This is an ordinary differential equation of second order. It is found in the solution to Laplace's equation in cylindrical coordinates:

for an arbitrary real or complex number  (the order of the Bessel function). The most common and important special case is where  is an integer .

Dividing this equation by x2 gives:

Thus this equation has a regular singularity at 0.

To see what happens when  one has to use a Möbius transformation, for example . After performing the algebra:

Now at 

has a pole of first order, but

has a pole of fourth order. Thus, this equation has an irregular singularity at  corresponding to x at ∞.

Legendre differential equation
This is an ordinary differential equation of second order. It is found in the solution of Laplace's equation in spherical coordinates:

Opening the square bracket gives:

And dividing by :

This differential equation has regular singular points at ±1 and ∞.

Hermite differential equation
One encounters this ordinary second order differential equation in solving the one-dimensional time independent Schrödinger equation

for a harmonic oscillator. In this case the potential energy V(x) is:

This leads to the following ordinary second order differential equation:

This differential equation has an irregular singularity at ∞. Its solutions are Hermite polynomials.

Hypergeometric equation
The equation may be defined as

Dividing both sides by  gives:

This differential equation has regular singular points at 0, 1 and ∞. A solution is the hypergeometric function.

References
 
 E. T. Copson, An Introduction to the Theory of Functions of a Complex Variable (1935)
 
 A. R. Forsyth Theory of Differential Equations Vol. IV: Ordinary Linear Equations (Cambridge University Press, 1906)
 Édouard Goursat, A Course in Mathematical Analysis, Volume II, Part II: Differential Equations pp. 128−ff. (Ginn & co., Boston, 1917)
 E. L. Ince, Ordinary Differential Equations, Dover Publications (1944)
 
 T. M. MacRobert Functions of a Complex Variable p. 243 (MacMillan, London, 1917)
 
 E. T. Whittaker and G. N. Watson A Course of Modern Analysis pp. 188−ff. (Cambridge University Press, 1915)

Ordinary differential equations
Complex analysis